Andreas Douzos (17 April 1934 - 29 April 2013) was a Greek theatre and film actor best known for starring in the prominent musical films of the Finos Films, Kiss the Girls (1965) and Rendez-vous in the Air (1966) where the films’ publicity and success turned him into a famous actor.

He began appearing in films in 1953 with The Damned (1953), and from then on he appeared in more than thirty films until 2001. In the theatrical season 1955/1956 he participated, portrayed Nikolios, in the drama play The Christ Recrucified held at Alsos theatre. A 1955 made-for-theatre adaption of the 1954 novel of the same name written by Nikos Kazantzakis, directed by Takis Mouzenidis with cast of the theatre troupe of Manos Katrakis’ People’s Theatre. When the protagonist actor Manos Katrakis, who portrayed Manolios, was taken ill and cannot play, then Andreas Douzos has proposed whether it would be possible to play this role because he knew it before. Thereafter, he was chosen to act the role gained further recognition and critical acclaim.
 
In an appearance broadcast on ERT TV channel’s Kalitechniko Kafenio program in 1985 with presenters Vasilis Tsivilikas, Costas Ferris, Mimis Plessas, Andreas Douzos revealed "I denied to offer myself to anyone for exchange activities in regards to career benefits", a declaration of being one of his principles.
 
He studied acting from 1952 to 1955 at the Takis Mouzenidis’s Institute of Musical Theatre (Greek: Σπουδαστήριο του Μουσικού Θεάτρου) and was under the tutelage of renowned acting teacher Takis Mouzenidis. 
By the time he was still an acting student at the age 19, he married Anastasia Ntouzou (1937-2016) with whom he had one daughter and a son, Teta (Panagiota) Ntouzou (born 1964) and Steve (Eustathios) Douzos (born 1959) both of whom later were played in roles in Greek low-budget B-movies during the 1980s. He had two granddaughters from his daughter, and one granddaughter and one grandson from his son. When he was about 31-year-old, he relocated from Greece to New York City, United States, residing from 1967 to 1980 in the borough of The Bronx, during which time he studied directing at the Actors Studio Drama School, and he also attended professional choreography courses at the Martha Graham Center of Contemporary Dance lasted five years.
 
Subsequently he returned to Greece, where he relocated permanently in Athens, he became theatrical entrepreneur founded his own theatrical company in 1982 the Theatrical Businesses Andreas Ntouzos undertook the Superstar Theatre (later renamed Broadway Theatre; today known as the Theatro Katia Dandoulaki) 1000m2 in the Athens district of Kypseli. In 1990/1991 theatrical season, starred in the Jean de Létraz play Chasing love (Chasse gardée;) staged at the Superstar Thearte which he himself directed.

In 1994, in order to withdraw his business shares due to financial difficulties, he sold the business of theatre to actress Katia Dandoulaki. His last film role appearance was in the film Athens Blues (2001; Greek original title it can be literally translated as A Day Night) directed by Giorgos Panousopoulos.

After being diagnosed with Parkinson's disease, ιn January, 2013 he was seriously injured his head after an accident he sustained at his home and he underwent a medical intervention thereafter, remained in a hospital’s intensive care unit. After several days of hospitalization he died on April 29, 2013 at the age of 76. He was buried at Second Cemetery of Athens on May 2, 2013.

Feature films

Selected theatrical plays

References

External links 
 

1936 births
2013 deaths
Actors Studio alumni     
 Greek male film actors
Male actors from Athens